Katharina Matz (11 June 1935 – 3 March 2021) was a Czech-born German film and television actress.

Selected filmography
 The Man Who Sold Himself (1959)
 As You Like It (1970)
 The Wonderful Years (1979)
  (1988)

Television appearances
 Maximilian von Mexiko (1970)
 The Old Fox: Tödlicher Bumerang (1985)
 The Old Fox: Der sanfte Tod (1987)
 Rosamunde Pilcher: Das Ende eines Sommers (1995)
 Notruf Hafenkante: Herz an Herz (2008)

References

External links
 

1935 births
2021 deaths
German film actresses
People from Liberec District
German television actresses
20th-century German actresses
21st-century German actresses
Sudeten German people